Pliska was the first capital of the First Bulgarian Empire during the Middle Ages and is now a small town in Shumen Province, Bulgaria.

It is also a surname. It may refer to:

People
Almir Pliska (born 1987), Bosnian-Herzegovinian footballer
Fritz Pliska (1915–1995), German footballer
Heinz Pliska (born 1941), German footballer

Others
Battle of Pliska or Battle of Vărbitsa Pass, a series of battles between troops, gathered from all parts of the Byzantine Empire, led by the Emperor Nicephorus I, and the First Bulgarian Empire, governed by Khan Krum
Pliska Ridge, three-peaked ridge in eastern Livingston Island in the South Shetland Islands, Antarctica
Pliska rosette, a 7th-9th century seven-pointed bronze rosette found in Pliska, the medieval capital of Bulgaria

See also